Northgate is a suburb of Greater Johannesburg, Gauteng Province, South Africa (specifically Randburg). Northgate contains a major shopping mall (Northgate Shopping Centre).

References

Johannesburg Region C